Cutaneous small-vessel vasculitis (CSVV), also known as hypersensitivity vasculitis, cutaneous leukocytoclastic vasculitis, hypersensitivity angiitis, cutaneous leukocytoclastic angiitis, cutaneous necrotizing vasculitis and cutaneous necrotizing venulitis, is inflammation of small blood vessels (usually post-capillary venules in the dermis), characterized by palpable purpura. It is the most common vasculitis  seen in clinical practice.

"Leukocytoclastic" refers to the damage caused by nuclear debris from infiltrating neutrophils in and around the vessels.

Signs and symptoms

Skin lesions 
Initially red to pink, flat spots (formally, "macules") and raised bumps (formally, "papules") may be seen on the skin.

Once fully developed, the classic appearance is "non-blanching, palpable purpura". This appears as deep red to purple spots that feel raised to the touch. Purpura refers to the red-purple discolored spots, while palpable implies that these spots can be felt as raised from the surrounding skin. Additionally, when gently pressed, the color does not fade to a lighter color ("non-blanching"). The red-purple color of the lesions is due to the inflammation in the blood vessels causing red blood cells to escape into the dermis skin layer.

Small fluid-filled blisters (or "vesicles"), pus-filled bumps resembling a pimple (or "pustules"), or shallow ulcers may also develop but are less common.

The location of skin lesions varies but are most commonly found symmetrically below the waist, primarily on the buttocks and legs. Other distributions include localized areas on the upper body or over several areas of the body.

With treatment, the lesions typically resolve in weeks to months and leave behind flat spots that are darker than the surrounding skin (see "Postinflammatory hyperpigmentation" on "Hyperpigmentation").

A portion of cases may be persistent or recurrent. This tends to occur when the vasculitis is associated with chronic conditions such as connective tissue diseases.

Associated symptoms 
In most cases skin lesions do not cause symptoms, however itching, burning, or pain may occur.

Frequently reported symptoms include mild fever, muscle pain, joint pain, or an overall feeling of discomfort. Additional symptoms depend on the cause of the vasculitis and if other organ systems are involved. For example, if the vasculitis is a manifestation of Henoch–Schönlein purpura, individuals may also experience abdominal pain or blood in the urine.

Cause
Cutaneous vasculitis can have various causes including but not limited to medications, bacterial and viral infections or allergens. It is estimated that 45–55% of cases are idiopathic, meaning the cause is unknown. In cases where a cause can be determined, medications and infectious pathogens are most common in adults, while IgA vasculitis (Henoch–Schönlein purpura) frequently affects children. Other etiologies include autoimmune conditions and malignancies, usually hematologic (related to the blood).

The small vessels in the skin affected are located in the superficial dermis and include arterioles (small arteries carrying blood to capillaries), capillaries, and venules (small veins receiving blood from capillaries). In general, immune complexes deposit in vessel walls leading to activation of the complement system. C3a and C5a, proteins produced from the complement system, attract neutrophils to the vessels. Once activated, neutrophils then release preformed substances, including enzymes causing damage to vessel tissue. Evidence of this process can be seen with a sample of removed skin tissue, or biopsy, viewed under a microscope. Neutrophils are seen surrounding blood vessels and their debris within vessel walls, causing fibrinoid necrosis. This finding on histological examination is termed "leukocytoclastic vasculitis".

Considering the wide range of potential causes leading to cutaneous small vessel vasculitis, there are subtle variations in the underlying pathophysiology for each cause. For example, medications are metabolized to smaller molecules that can attach to proteins in the blood or vessel walls. The immune system senses these altered proteins as foreign and produces antibodies in efforts to eliminate them from the body. A similar process occurs with infectious agents, such as bacteria, in which antibodies target microbial components.

Diagnosis

The diagnostic testing for vasculitis should be guided by the patient's history and physical exam. The clinician should ask about the duration, onset, and presence any associated symptoms such as weight loss or fatigue (that would indicate a systemic cause). It is important to distinguish between IgA and non-IgA vasculitis. IgA vasculitis is more likely to present with abdominal pain, bloody urine, and joint pain. In the case that the cause is not obvious, a reasonable initial workup would include a complete blood count, urinalysis, basic metabolic panel, fecal occult blood testing, erythrocyte sedimentation rate (ESR), and C-reactive protein level. Small vessel cutaneous vasculitis is a diagnosis of exclusion and requires ruling out systemic causes of the skin findings. Skin biopsy (punch or excisional) is the most definitive diagnostic test and should be performed with 48 hours of appearance of the vasculitis. A skin biopsy will be able to determine if the clinical findings are truly due to a vasculitis or due to some other cause.

Classification 
Subtypes of small-vessel vasculitis include:

 IgA vasculitis (Henoch-Schönlein purpura)
 Acute hemorrhagic edema of infancy
 Urticarial vasculitis
 Cryoglobulinemic vasculitis
 Erythema elevatum diutinum
 Granuloma faciale
 ANCA-associated vasculitis
 Arthropod bites
 Platelet dysfunction or deficiency
 Cholesterol emboli
 Septic emboli
 Livedoid vasculopathy

Treatment
Treatment should be directed towards the specific underlying cause of the vasculitis. If no underlying cause is found and the vasculitis is truly limited to the skin then treatment is primarily supportive. Such treatment involves measures such as leg elevation, stockings, and topical steroids to relieve itching/burning. If the vasculitis does not self-resolve within 3–4 weeks, more aggressive treatment may be warranted. Oral colchicine or dapsone are often used for this purpose. If rapid control of symptoms is needed, a short course of high-dose oral steroids may be given. Immunosuppressive agents such as methotrexate and azathioprine may be used in truly refractory cases not responsive to colchicine or dapsone.

Additional images

See also 
 Skin lesion
 List of cutaneous conditions

References

External links 

Systemic connective tissue disorders
Vascular-related cutaneous conditions
Immune system disorders